is a Japanese former footballer and current manager of the Mongolia national team.

He served as head coach of Albirex Niigata Singapore between 2005 and 2006.

Personal life
Otsuka is the father of footballer Sho Otsuka.

References

1964 births
Living people
Japanese footballers
Hosei University alumni
Japan Soccer League players
JEF United Chiba players
Japanese expatriate sportspeople in Singapore
Expatriate football managers in Singapore
Japanese football managers
Association football defenders